The Arapi Family House is a cultural heritage monument in Prizren, Kosovo.

History
The Arapi family home is in Prizren's historic city center, facing south in the neighborhood of Saraçëve. The house was built in the late 19th century and has been continually inhabited since. The mezzanine, windows, doors, and roof are wooden, the latter covered in two layers of tile. The rectangular, two-story building opens onto the street by a large wooden door behind an open porch, above which lies a closed alcove with five front windows. Furniture includes elaborately decorated ceilings, molded wooden cupboards, stairs, a chimney and a bathroom, in addition to ample fire utensils. The ceilings are finished with blue stucco and include an octagonal rose decorated with floral ornaments. The yard has a landscaped garden and dining patio.

References

Historic sites in Kosovo